Havyard Group is a Norwegian ship technology company, headquartered in Fosnavåg, Norway. The company was started in 2000 with the purchase of Løland verft in Leirvik.

Havyard was listed on the Oslo Stock Exchange in July 2014.

References

Norwegian shipbuilders
Norwegian companies established in 2000
Companies based in Møre og Romsdal
Companies listed on the Oslo Stock Exchange
Manufacturing companies established in 2000